The Cunningham C7 Grand Touring car was an American limited production high performance luxury sports coupe. It was first introduced to the public at the 2001 North American International Auto Show.

The beginning 
Within four years of the end of World War II, Italian car makers such as Ferrari, Maserati, and Germany's Mercedes Benz were already offering Grand Touring cars and sports cars. Despite the fact that American machinery had won the war, America had little in the way of automotive offerings at the time that was comparable to certain vehicles and segments of the mentioned car makers of Europe. Briggs Swift Cunningham II of Greens Farms, Connecticut was convinced that America should build Grand Touring cars and American sports cars that could effortlessly compete with the very best that Europe had to offer. Cunningham's family had funded the founding of Procter & Gamble, the Baltimore and Ohio Railroad and the Bank of Ohio and he could afford such ambitions.

West Palm Beach
Working from a factory established in West Palm Beach, Florida, Briggs Weaver (former chief engineer of Indian Motorcycles), Phil Walters (race car driver and chassis designer), and John (Jack) Donaldson led a team which developed a line of automobiles. Together, they would produce a series of "firsts". The first modern American sports car, the C-1, was an aluminum-bodied, front-engine, V-8 powerhouse, a design that became the template for subsequent American manufacturers. The first modern American Grand Touring car, the C-3, but with a distinctive American approach.

The ultimate American sportscar
In 1952, the Cunningham C-4R was released in both coupe and roadster configurations. Powered by the original Chrysler 331 Hemi V-8, the 400 horsepower car weighed 2400 pounds. It would be ten years before another American sports car could challenge the C-4R for performance. That car, the Shelby Cobra, now an American performance icon, was directly inspired by the Cunningham C-4R. Carroll Shelby knew about Cunningham when he introduced the Cobra. In 1952, Shelby was driving for Aston Martin at Le Mans against the C-4R and lost to them. Shelby even copied Cunningham's paint scheme, which was white cars with two blue racing stripes, which Shelby reversed.

Cunningham's efforts were big news in America. At one point Briggs and his cars appeared on the front cover of Time magazine (April 26, 1954). The Time writer, thinking that the operation was financially successful, remarked to Briggs that he seemed to have made a small fortune from his motorsports efforts and asked him how he had done this. Briggs answered by saying "start with a large fortune".

Closing of the factory
In 1955, Briggs closed the factory after producing just 37 cars; he had been unable to turn a profit. Briggs then established a successful race car team and Jaguar cars made him their eastern US distributor. Briggs also pursued his love of competitive sailing. He won the America's Cup in 1958.

Modern Cunningham
In 1993, writer and former racer Lawrence (Larry) Black recognized that America lacked a Grand Touring car and decided to attach the Cunningham identity to a modern Grand Touring car. Black approached Stephen Norman, owner of the BMW dealership in downtown Seattle. Norman provided the initial capital for Black's efforts to resurrect Cunningham as an American auto manufacturer.

Briggs Swift Cunningham II was elderly and in poor health, but his only son, Briggs Swift Cunningham III, was so interested that he bought out Steve Norman's interest in the firm.

Virtually integrated manufacturing
In 1993, Larry Black had come up with a novel idea for organizing and reducing the costs of operating a new car company. Called V.I.M. or virtually integrated manufacturing, this approach was the reverse of Henry Ford's vertically integrated manufacturing, which sought to own and control the entire process of manufacturing, from raw materials to distribution of finished product. Since there was a significant degree of unused manufacturing capacity in the automobile industry, it would be possible to create a "virtual" car company, where Cunningham Motor Cars would be a design, engineering and marketing firm while other firms with excess capacity would be willing to manufacture and build the major components as subcontractors. It might even be possible to enlist the support of one of America's big three auto manufacturers as the source of power-trains for the project.

Black sought advice from American automotive journalist David E. Davis, the founder of Automobile. Black asked Davis about Bob Lutz, who was well thought of in the enthusiast community. Davis advised Black about contacting Lutz, who was then President of Chrysler Corporation. Chrysler had been the second engine supplier to Cunningham (after Cadillac) in the 1950s. The reception was positive. Lutz was a Cunningham enthusiast and even had a signed C-4RK race photograph in his office.

Cunningham and Chrysler
By order of Lutz, Chrysler engineers developed and produced a prototype engine, a V-12 331 c.i. By some accounts the Cunningham project also contributed to a re-kindled interest within Chrysler for their famed "Hemi" engines so that work began to bring "the Hemi", a modern line-up of the well known, accomplished and famed engine architecture back into mass production and to market.

Cunningham's efforts continued on other fronts as well. Black, the managing partner of Cunningham, thought it crucial to establish creditability for the "new" Cunningham by once again building 1952 Cunningham C-4Rs. An operation to build continuation C-4Rs was formed in Lime Rock, Connecticut, at the race track designed and built by one of the original Cunningham team drivers, John Fitch.

Media attention
The role of the continuation operation, which was hand-building C4Rs for the first time in almost half a century, was to gain favorable press attention and remind the potential customer base of what Cunningham had represented to American automotive history. Many auto and general interest publications sent correspondents to test the C4Rs being built in Lime Rock, including Car and Driver, Automobile, Road & Track, Forbes, London's Sunday Times, the New York Times and a number of European car publications. The coverage generated great interest in the upcoming modern Cunningham, now being called the C7.

Interest was gathering for the "virtual car company" idea as well. Forbes would later put Bob Lutz on their cover under the words "Bob Lutz's Secret", the business model that Larry Black had first shared with Lutz in 1995. The real secret was how little money would have to be raised to launch the new company. Careful financial research predicted that an 80% savings would be realized over a conventional automobile start-up.

Daimler/Chrysler
No one involved could have predicted the consequences of Mercedes merging with Chrysler, which was in the offing. The Germans saw the new C7 Cunningham as a threat to their Maybach, much like they later would also thwart Chrysler's Supercar project, the ME Four-Twelve which was well into development and intended to be brought to production as a Halo car for the Chrysler brand as a testament to their engineering prowess.  Subsequently the C7 project and support within the new Daimler/Chrysler evaporated. Lutz left Chrysler and became the CEO of Exide Batteries and Cunningham lost their automaker ally. Cunningham needed a "Big Three" sponsor again. Efforts to develop the modern Cunningham continued, since the basic idea of having a "virtual" car company build an American Grand Touring car and market it under the Cunningham brand was inherently strong.

Cunningham/GM
Once again, David E. Davis intervened. Since the first Cunningham race cars were Cadillac powered, Davis suggested that the partners approach General Motors. Lutz said that he didn't know anyone at General Motors, so Davis arranged for Black and Lutz to meet with GM executives Rick Waggoner (CEO) Wayne Cherry (head of design) and Arv Mueller (GM Powertrain). This meeting served to remind GM that in 1950 Cunningham raced Cadillac based cars at Le Mans and the 50th anniversary of that event was approaching.

Black was now consulting with Arv Mueller, the head of GM Powertrain, on what would be the GM approach to a Cunningham power plant. Once again, a V-12 configuration was selected as the market demanded an exotic engine in an exotic car. The precise layout came from Black, who requested a 60 degree angle between the two banks of cylinders. The reason for the request was simple: Black recalled hearing the stirring exhaust notes of Ferrari race cars in his youth, all of which used 60 degree V-12s.

Despite there being a design proposal that Black and Cunningham had presented to Lutz, he selected a retired designer from Chrysler to draw the Cunningham C7 exterior. As Brock Yates would later write in Car and Driver, this was a missed opportunity. None of the Chrysler designer's submissions appealed to Briggs or Black, so once again David E. Davis came to the rescue. When asked by Black who was the best independent designer in Detroit, Davis' immediate answer was Stewart Reed. Unknown to Black or Davis, Lutz was already asking the same thing of his people and they gave the same answer: Stewart Reed.

Stewart Reed design
The initial Stewart Reed design submission was approved by Black, Lutz and Cunningham and the refinement process began. What emerged was stunning; a broad shouldered, muscular and very American Grand Touring car. The debut was just six months away and there are few fabrication firms that could handle such a deadline for a show car. Reed suggested Special Projects in Plymouth, Michigan and he and Black met with their principal, Kenny Yanez. Yanez agreed.

In the interim, Lutz had chosen another fabrication firm, but despite having been paid $750,000 in advance, they produced nothing. As a result, Reed and Black had to go back to Yanez and see if he could still do the project. Yanez again agreed and just days before the show, it was finished.

Cunningham today
The debut at the 2001 Detroit show was a triumph for the concept of the modern Cunningham, but internal politics halted any further progress. The car's striking design and the low cost of the project so impressed GM that they made Bob Lutz vice-chairman of GM. Larry Black and Briggs Cunningham III were forced out of the firm by Lutz, eventually leading to a lawsuit.  Both the original Cunningham cars and the continuation cars are highly valuable, benefiting from Briggs' racing legacy and are investment grade vehicles. The "Lime Rock" cars (the continuation C4Rs built in Lime Rock, Connecticut) are worth some multiple of their original purchase price.  The Cunningham family maintains involvement in high performance automobiles, with Brian Cunningham having enjoyed many years as a professional race car driver while his father Briggs Cunningham III is a racing team owner and is both Jack Roush and Roger Penske's driver development team owner.

Stewart Reed Design proposed a convertible C7 which was well received by media and design professionals, and while plans exist, both the coupe and convertible designs remain unrealized. The cars were never built.

References

Cars of the United States